Tinomiscium is a genus of flowering plants belonging to the family Menispermaceae.

Its native range is Tropical and Temperate Asia.

Species:
 Tinomiscium petiolare Hook.f. & Thomson

References

Menispermaceae
Menispermaceae genera